Virgil Bărbuceanu (20 April 1927 – October 2004) was a Romanian equestrian. He competed at the 1956 Summer Olympics and the 1960 Summer Olympics.

Born in Bobaița, Mehedinți County, Bărbuceanu attended high school in Turnu Severin, and graduated in 1952 with the rank of lieutenant from the Cavalry Officer School in Sibiu. He then joined the Army Equestrian Club in Bucharest and later served as colonel in the Romanian Army. In 1986, he founded the Equestrian Base in Piatra Neamț, which now bears his name.

References

External links
 

1927 births
2004 deaths
Romanian male equestrians
Olympic equestrians of Romania
Equestrians at the 1956 Summer Olympics
Equestrians at the 1960 Summer Olympics
People from Mehedinți County
20th-century Romanian military personnel
Romanian Land Forces officers